Dishon is a moshav in northern Israel. It is located near the border with Lebanon, within the Naftali Mountains, near the Dishon Stream. It falls under the jurisdiction of Mevo'ot HaHermon Regional Council.

Dishon was established in 1953 by Jewish immigrants from Libya, on land belonging to the depopulated Arab Palestinian village of Dayshum.

Its name is a variation of the name of the Palestinian village.

Dishon ATVs is the oldest ATV tours company in Israel, offering offroad trips by ATV and jeep in the Galilee, Hula Valley and Golan Heights.

References

Moshavim
Populated places in Northern District (Israel)
Populated places established in 1953
1953 establishments in Israel
Libyan-Jewish culture in Israel